The 1996 State of Origin series saw the 15th time that the annual three-game series between the Queensland and New South Wales representative rugby league football teams was contested entirely under 'state of origin' selection rules. This series saw the return to representative football of players who had signed with Super League, after a court decision had delayed the beginning of Super League until at least 2000. As a result, both teams were back to full strength, and a new record was set for the highest State of Origin crowd at the Sydney Football Stadium.

New South Wales were able to bounce back from the 3 - 0 whitewash of the 1995 Series and win the 1996 series 3 - 0, reversing the result of the previous year. The first send off in Origin history occurred in 1996 and New South Wales made further history as the first side to go through a complete series without a player change.


Game I

The Blues came out in the opener at Suncorp Stadium with all guns blazing, as the Maroons were overwhelmed all over the park and went down 14-6. If everything had gone their way though, the Blues would have finished streets ahead.

The decision by the selectors to go in with the 1995 World Cup halfback and hooker combination of Andrew Johns and Geoff Toovey was the spark that ignited the Blues. Up front New South Wales simply out muscled their opponents with Glenn Lazarus putting in an extraordinary performance. Despite the fact unlimited interchange was in force for the first time in Origin, Lazarus stayed on the paddock for the full 80 minutes.

Wendell Sailor was brilliant for the Maroons on debut, their most attacking player, but the partnership of Allan Langer and Jason Smith in the halves didn't work and the Queenslanders' ball control was poor. Tim Brasher, chosen at fullback with Brett Mullins forced to the wing, justified his selection with a brilliant performance, while Paul Harragon was inspirational up front with Lazarus.

Game II

The Blues comfortably wrapped up the series with an 18-6 win in game II at the Sydney Football Stadium, with Laurie Daley and Andrew Ettingshausen demonstrating repeatedly all the skills and speed that stamped them as Origin greats.

The game was marred by the first send-off in State of Origin history when Queensland replacement forward Craig Greenhill was marched for a high tackle on Blues prop Paul Harragon.  A specially convened State of Origin judiciary suspended him for four matches.

Blues coach Phil Gould said after the game that New South Wales could make some history of their own by being the first side to go through an entire Origin series unchanged. His prediction proved correct.

Game III

The Blues skipped away to a 15-2 lead halfway through game III and with only eight minutes remaining it appeared all was lost for the Langer-led Queenslanders. Blues captain Brad Fittler had earlier potted a field goal which seemed to be almost an indulgence at the time, though in the end it proved crucial as the Maroons came storming home.

First Mark Coyne managed to somehow produce a try after the ball ricocheted off his boot, then Matt Sing made a break to put speedy winger Brett Dallas over. At 15-14 the Queenslanders suddenly had a full head of steam. With seconds remaining Langer put on a cross-field kick which was pounced on by Coyne. The Suncorp Stadium crowd went into a frenzy thinking that Coyne had pulled off another miracle Origin try but referee David Manson looked to this touch judge who ruled that Coyne had been in front of the kicker.

New South Wales teams

Queensland teams

See also
1996 ARL season

References

Sources
 Big League's 25 Years of Origin Collectors' Edition, News Magazines, Surry Hills, Sydney

External links
1996 State of Origin at sportsphotography.net

State of Origin series
State of Origin series